Radium jaw, or radium necrosis, is a historic occupational disease brought on by the ingestion and subsequent absorption of radium into the bones of radium dial painters. It also affected those consuming radium-laden patent medicines. The symptoms are necrosis of the mandible (lower jawbone) and the maxilla (upper jaw), constant bleeding of the gums, and (usually) after some time, severe distortion due to bone tumors and porosity of the lower jaw.

The condition is similar to phossy jaw, an osteoporotic and osteonecrotic illness of matchgirls, brought on by phosphorus ingestion and absorption. The first written reference to the disease was by a dentist, Dr. Theodor Blum, in 1924, who described an unusual mandibular osteomyelitis in a dial painter, naming it "radium jaw".

The disease was determined by pathologist Dr. H.S. Martland in 1924 to be symptomatic of radium paint ingestion, after many female workers from various radium paint companies reported similar dental and mandibular pain. Symptoms were present in the mouth due to use of the lips and tongue to keep the radium-paint paintbrushes properly shaped. The disease was the main reason for litigation against the United States Radium Corporation by the Radium Girls.

Another prominent example of this condition was the death of American golfer and industrialist Eben Byers in 1932, after taking large doses of Radithor, a radioactive patent medicine containing radium, over several years. His illness garnered much publicity, and brought the problem of radioactive quack medicines into the public eye. The Wall Street Journal ran a story (in 1989 or after) titled "The Radium Water Worked Fine until His Jaw Came Off".

See also
Acute radiation syndrome (not involved in radium jaw)
Radium Dial Company
Radium dials

References

External links
Radium in Humans: A Review of U.S. Studies

Occupational diseases
Radium
Osteonecrosis